Vladimir Tainikov, Uladzimir Taynikaw (born June 23, 1959) is a Soviet sprint canoer who competed in the late 1970s and early 1980s. He won four medals at the ICF Canoe Sprint World Championships with a gold (K-2 1000 m: 1978), a silver (K-4 500 m: 1979), and two bronzes (K-2 500 m: 1978, K-2 1000 m: 1979).

Trainikov also finished seventh in the K-4 1000 m event at the 1980 Summer Olympics in Moscow.

References

Sports-Reference.com profile

1959 births
Canoeists at the 1980 Summer Olympics
Living people
Olympic canoeists of the Soviet Union
Soviet male canoeists
Belarusian male canoeists
ICF Canoe Sprint World Championships medalists in kayak